The Constitution Alteration (Interchange of Powers) Bill 1984, was an unsuccessful proposal to alter the Australian Constitution so that the states and the federal government could freely interchange powers at will. It was put to voters for approval in a referendum held on 1 December 1984.

Results
An Act to enable the Commonwealth and the States voluntarily to refer powers to each other.

Do you approve this proposed alteration?

References

See also

Referendum (Interchange of Powers)
1984 referendums
Constitutional referendums in Australia